The 1995–96 National Professional Soccer League season was the twelfth season for the league.

League standings

American Division

National Division

Playoffs

Scoring leaders

GP = Games Played, G = Goals, A = Assists, Pts = Points

League awards
 Most Valuable Player: Hector Marinaro, Cleveland & Victor Nogueira, Milwaukee                          
 Defender of the Year: Matt Knowles, Milwaukee
 Rookie of the Year: Jason Willan, Detroit
 Goalkeeper of the Year: Victor Nogueira, Milwaukee
 Coach of the Year: Keith Tozer, Milwaukee

All-NPSL Teams

All-NPSL Rookie Teams

References
Major Indoor Soccer League II (RSSSF)

1995 in American soccer leagues
1996 in American soccer leagues
1995-96